The Sikorsky UH-60 Black Hawk is a four-blade, twin-engine, medium-lift utility military helicopter manufactured by Sikorsky Aircraft. Sikorsky submitted the S-70 design for the United States Army's Utility Tactical Transport Aircraft System (UTTAS) competition in 1972. The Army designated the prototype as the YUH-60A and selected the Black Hawk as the winner of the program in 1976, after a fly-off competition with the Boeing Vertol YUH-61.

Named after the Native American war leader Black Hawk, the UH-60A entered service with the U.S. Army in 1979, to replace the Bell UH-1 Iroquois as the Army's tactical transport helicopter. This was followed by the fielding of electronic warfare and special operations variants of the Black Hawk. Improved UH-60L and UH-60M utility variants have also been developed. Modified versions have also been developed for the U.S. Navy, Air Force, and Coast Guard. In addition to U.S. Army use, the UH-60 family has been exported to several nations. Black Hawks have served in combat during conflicts in Grenada, Panama, Iraq, Somalia, the Balkans, Afghanistan, and other areas in the Middle East.

Development

Initial requirement
In the late 1960s, the United States Army began forming requirements for a helicopter to replace the UH-1 Iroquois, and designated the program as the Utility Tactical Transport Aircraft System (UTTAS). The Army also initiated the development of a new, common turbine engine for its helicopters that would become the General Electric T700. Based on experience in Vietnam, the Army required significant performance, survivability and reliability improvements from both UTTAS and the new powerplant. The Army released its UTTAS request for proposals (RFP) in January 1972. The RFP also included air transport requirements. Transport within the C-130 limited the UTTAS cabin height and length.

The UTTAS requirements for improved reliability, survivability and lower life-cycle costs resulted in features such as dual-engines with improved hot and high altitude performance, and a modular design (reduced maintenance footprint); run-dry gearboxes; ballistically tolerant, redundant subsystems (hydraulic, electrical and flight controls); crashworthy crew (armored) and troop seats; dual-stage oleo main landing gear; ballistically tolerant, crashworthy main structure; quieter, more robust main and tail rotor systems; and a ballistically tolerant, crashworthy fuel system.

Four prototypes were constructed, with the first YUH-60A flying on 17 October 1974. Prior to delivery of the prototypes to the US Army, a preliminary evaluation was conducted in November 1975 to ensure the aircraft could be operated safely during all testing. Three of the prototypes were delivered to the Army in March 1976, for evaluation against the rival Boeing-Vertol design, the YUH-61A, and one was kept by Sikorsky for internal research. The Army selected the UH-60 for production in December 1976. Deliveries of the UH-60A to the Army began in October 1978 and the helicopter entered service in June 1979.

Upgrades and variations
After entering service, the helicopter was modified for new missions and roles, including mine laying and medical evacuation. An EH-60 variant was developed to conduct electronic warfare and special operations aviation developed the MH-60 variant to support its missions.

Due to weight increases from the addition of mission equipment and other changes, the Army ordered the improved UH-60L in 1987. The new model incorporated all of the modifications made to the UH-60A fleet as standard design features. The UH-60L also featured more power and lifting capability with upgraded T700-GE-701C engines and an improved gearbox, both from the SH-60B Seahawk. The UH-60L also incorporated the SH-60B's automatic flight control system (AFCS) for better flight control with the more powerful engines. Production of the L-model began in 1989.

Development of the next improved variant, the UH-60M, was approved in 2001, to extend the service life of the UH-60 design into the 2020s. The UH-60M incorporates upgraded T700-GE-701D engines, improved rotor blades, and state of the art electronic instrumentation, flight controls and aircraft navigation control. After the U.S. DoD approved low-rate initial production of the new variant, manufacturing began in 2006, with the first of 22 new UH-60Ms delivered in July 2006. After an initial operational evaluation, the Army approved full-rate production and a five-year contract for 1,227 helicopters in December 2007. By March 2009, 100 UH-60M helicopters had been delivered to the Army. In November 2014, US military ordered 102 aircraft of various H-60 types, worth $1.3 billion.

Following their use in the operation to kill Osama bin Laden in May 2011, it emerged that the 160th SOAR used a secret version of the UH-60 modified with low-observable technology which enabled it to evade Pakistani radar. Analysis of the tail section, the only remaining part of the aircraft which crashed during the operation, revealed extra blades on the tail rotor and other noise reduction measures, making the craft much quieter than conventional UH-60s. The aircraft appeared to include features like special high-tech materials, harsh angles, and flat surfaces found only in stealth jets. Low observable versions of the Black Hawk have been studied as far back as the mid-1970s.

In September 2012, Sikorsky was awarded a Combat Tempered Platform Demonstration (CTPD) contract to further improve the Black Hawk's durability and survivability. The company is to develop new technologies such as a zero-vibration system, adaptive flight control laws, advanced fire management, a more durable main rotor, full-spectrum crashworthiness, and damage tolerant airframe; then they are to transition them to the helicopter. Improvements to the Black Hawk are to continue until the Future Vertical Lift program is ready to replace it.

In December 2014, the 101st Airborne Division began testing new resupply equipment called the Enhanced Speed Bag System (ESBS). Soldiers in the field requiring quick resupply have depended on speed bags, bags filled with items airdropped from a UH-60. However, all systems were ad hoc with bags not made to keep things secure from impacts, so up to half of the airdropped items would be damaged upon hitting the ground. Started in 2011, the ESBS sought to standardize the airdrop resupply method and keep up to 90 percent of supplies intact. The system includes a hands-free reusable linear brake and expendable speed line and multipurpose cargo bag; when the bag is deployed, the brake applies friction to the rope, slowing it down enough to keep the bag oriented down on the padded base, a honeycomb and foam kit inside to dissipate energy. The ESBS not only better protects helicopter-dropped supplies, it allows the Black Hawk to fly higher above the ground,  up from 10 feet, while traveling , limiting exposure to ground fire. Since supplies can be delivered more accurately and the system can be automatically released on its own, the ESBS can enable autonomous resupply from unmanned helicopters.

Design

The UH-60 features four-blade main and tail rotors, and is powered by two General Electric T700 turboshaft engines. The main rotor is fully articulated and has elastomeric bearings in the rotor head. The tail rotor is canted and features a rigid crossbeam. The helicopter has a long, low profile shape to meet the Army's requirement for transporting aboard a C-130 Hercules, with some disassembly.

The Black Hawk helicopter series can perform a wide array of missions, including the tactical transport of troops, electronic warfare, and aeromedical evacuation. A VIP version known as the VH-60N is used to transport important government officials (e.g., Congress, Executive departments) with the helicopter's call sign of "Marine One" when transporting the President of the United States. In air assault operations, it can move a squad of 11 combat troops or reposition a 105 mm M119 howitzer with 30 rounds ammunition, and a four-man crew in a single lift. The Black Hawk is equipped with advanced avionics and electronics for increased survivability and capability, such as the Global Positioning System.

The UH-60 can be equipped with stub wings at the top of fuselage to carry fuel tanks or various armaments. The initial stub wing system is called External Stores Support System (ESSS). It has two pylons on each wing to carry two  and two  tanks in total. The four fuel tanks and associated lines and valves form the external extended range fuel system (ERFS). U.S. Army UH-60s have had their ESSS modified into the crashworthy external fuel system (CEFS) configuration, replacing the older tanks with up to four total  crashworthy tanks along with self-sealing fuel lines. The ESSS can also carry  of armament such as rockets, missiles and gun pods. The ESSS entered service in 1986. However, it was found that the four fuel tanks obstruct the field of fire for the door guns; thus, the external tank system (ETS), carrying two fuel tanks on the stub wings, was developed.

The unit cost of the H-60 models varies due to differences in specifications, equipment and quantities. For example, the unit cost of the Army's UH-60L Black Hawk is $5.9 million while the unit cost of the Air Force HH-60G Pave Hawk is $10.2 million.

Operational history

Australia

Australia ordered fourteen S-70A-9 Black Hawks in 1986 and an additional twenty-five Black Hawks in 1987. The first US produced Black Hawk was delivered in 1987 to the Royal Australian Air Force (RAAF). de Havilland Australia produced thirty-eight Black Hawks under license from Sikorsky in Australia delivering the first in 1988 and the last in 1991. In 1989, the RAAF's fleet of Black Hawks was transferred to the Australian Army. The Black Hawks saw operational service in Cambodia, Papua New Guinea, Indonesia, East Timor and Pakistan. In April 2009, the then-defence chief Air Chief Marshal Angus Houston, told the government not to deploy Black Hawks to Afghanistan as at the time they “lacked armor and self-defense systems”, and despite an upgrade to address this underway, it was more practical to use allies’ helicopters. In 2004, the government selected the Multi-Role Helicopter (MRH-90) Taipan, a variant of the NHIndustries NH90, to replace the Black Hawk even though the Department of Defence had recommended the S‐70M Black Hawk. In January 2014, the Army commenced retiring the fleet of thirty-four Black Hawks from service (five had been lost in accidents) and had planned for this to be completed by June 2018. The Chief of Army delayed the retirement of 20 Black Hawks until 2021 to enable the Army to develop a special operations role capable MRH-90. On 10 December 2021, the S-70A-9 Black Hawks were retired from service. On the same day, amid issues with the performance of the MRH-90s the government announced that they would be replaced by up to 40 UH-60M Black Hawks. The government is yet to place an order. The Australian reported that is hoped that six UH-60Ms maybe delivered in 2023 with all deliveries completed by 2026.

Brazil
Brazil received four UH-60L helicopters in 1997, for the Brazilian Army peacekeeping forces. It received six UH-60Ls configured for special forces, and search and rescue uses in 2008. It ordered ten more UH-60Ls in 2009; deliveries began in March 2011.

China
In December 1983, examples of the Aerospatiale AS-332 Super Puma, Bell 214ST SuperTransport and Sikorsky S-70A-5 (N3124B) were airlifted to Lhasa for testing. At the end of this testing, the People's Liberation Army Air Force purchased 24 S-70C-2s, equipped with more powerful GE T700-701A engines for improved high-altitude performance. While designated as civil variants of the S-70 for export purposes, they are operated by the People's Liberation Army Air Force.

Colombia

Colombia first received UH-60s from the United States in 1987. The Colombian National Police, Colombian Air Force, and Colombian Army use UH-60s to transport troops and supplies to places which are difficult to access by land for counter-insurgency (COIN) operations against drug and guerrilla organizations, for search and rescue, and for medical evacuation. Colombia also operates a militarized gunship version of the UH-60, with stub wings, locally known as Arpía.

The Colombian Army became the first worldwide operator of the S-70i with Terrain Awareness and Warning Capability (HTAWS) after taking delivery of the first two units on 13 August 2013.

Israel
The Israeli Air Force (IAF) received 10 surplus UH-60A Black Hawks from the United States in August 1994. Named Yanshuf by the IAF, the UH-60A began replacing Bell 212 utility helicopters. The IAF first used the UH-60s in combat during 1996 in southern Lebanon in Operation Grapes of Wrath against Hezbollah.

Mexico
The Mexican Air Force ordered its first two UH-60Ls in 1991, to transport special forces units, and another four in 1994. In July and August 2009, the Federal Police used UH-60s in attacks on drug traffickers. In August 2011, the Mexican Navy received three upgraded and navalized UH-60M. On 21 April 2014, the U.S. State Department approved the sale of 18 UH-60Ms to Mexico pending approval from Congress. In September 2014, Sikorsky received a $203.6 million firm-fixed-price contract modification for the 18 UH-60 designated for the Mexican Air Force.

Philippines

In March 2019, the Philippines' Department of National Defense (DND) signed a contract worth US$241.4 million with Lockheed Martin's Polish subsidiary PZL Mielec for 16 Sikorsky S-70i Black Hawks to the PAF. On 10 December 2020, the PAF commissioned their first batch of six S-70i Blackhawks, with the remaining 10 to be delivered in 2021. In June 2021, the air service received a second batch of five helicopters. In November 2021, the third batch of five arrived.

On 22 February 2022, DND and PZL Mielec formally signed the contract for 32 additional S-70i Black Hawks.

Poland
In 2019 January, Poland ordered 4 S-70i Black Hawks with 4 delivered to the Polish Special Forces in December that same year. Another 4 S-70i helicopters are on order with 2 scheduled for delivery in 2023 and 2 in 2024.

Slovakia
In February 2015, the U.S. State Department approved a possible Foreign Military Sale of nine UH-60Ms with associated equipment and support to Slovakia and sent to Congress for its approval. In April 2015, Slovakia's government approved the procurement of nine UH-60Ms along with training and support. In September 2015, Slovakia ordered four UH-60Ms. The first two UH-60Ms were delivered in June 2017; the Slovak Air Force had received all nine UH-60Ms by January 2020. These are to replace its old Soviet Mil Mi-17s. In 2020, Slovak minister of defense announced Slovakia's interest in buying two more UH-60Ms.

Slovak Training Academy from Košice, a private company, operates four older UH-60As for new pilot training.

Sweden

Sweden requested 15 UH-60M helicopters by Foreign Military Sale in September 2010. The UH-60Ms were ordered in May 2011, and deliveries began in January 2012. In March 2013, Swedish ISAF forces began using Black Hawks in Afghanistan for MEDEVAC purposes. The UH-60Ms have been fully operational since 2017.

Taiwan

Taiwan (Republic of China) operated S-70C-1/1A after the Republic of China Air Force received ten S-70C-1A and four S-70C-1 Bluehawk helicopters in June 1986 for Search and Rescue. Four more S-70C-6s were received in April 1998. The ROC Navy received the first of ten S-70C(M)-1s in July 1990. 11 S-70C(M)-2s were received beginning April 2000. In January 2010, the US announced approval for a Foreign Military Sale of 60 UH-60Ms to Taiwan with 30 designated for the Army, 15 for the National Airborne Service Corps (including the one that crashed off Orchid Island in 2018) and 15 for the Air Force Rescue Group (including the one that crashed 2 January 2020).

Turkey
Turkey has operated the UH-60 during NATO deployments to Afghanistan and the Balkans. The UH-60 has also been used in counter-terror/internal security operations.

The Black Hawk competed against the AgustaWestland AW149 in the Turkish General Use Helicopter Tender, to order up to 115 helicopters and produce many of them indigenously, with Turkish Aerospace Industries responsible for final integration and assembly. On 21 April 2011, Turkey announced the selection of Sikorsky's T-70.

In the course of the coup d'état attempt in Turkey on 15 July 2016, eight Turkish military personnel of various ranks landed in Greece's northeastern city of Alexandroupolis on board a Black Hawk helicopter and claimed political asylum in Greece. The helicopter was returned to Turkey shortly thereafter.

United States
The UH-60 entered service with the U.S. Army's 101st Combat Aviation Brigade of the 101st Airborne Division in June 1979. The U.S. military first used the UH-60 in combat during the invasion of Grenada in 1983, and again in the invasion of Panama in 1989. During the Gulf War in 1991, the UH-60 participated in the largest air assault mission in U.S. Army history with over 300 helicopters involved. Two UH-60s (89-26214 and 78–23015) were shot down, both on 27 February 1991, while performing Combat Search and Rescue of other downed aircrews, an F-16C pilot and the crew of a MEDEVAC UH-1H that were shot down earlier that day.

In 1993, Black Hawks featured prominently in the Battle of Mogadishu in Somalia. Black Hawks also saw action in the Balkans and Haiti in the 1990s. U.S. Army UH-60s and other helicopters conducted many air assault and other support missions during the 2003 invasion of Iraq. The UH-60 has continued to serve in operations in Afghanistan and Iraq.

Customs and Border Protection Office of Air and Marine (OAM) uses the UH-60 in its operations specifically along the southwest border. The Black Hawk has been used by OAM to interdict illegal entry into the U.S. Additionally, OAM regularly uses the UH-60 in search and rescue operations.

Highly modified H-60s were employed during the U.S. Special Operations mission that resulted in the death of Osama bin Laden during Operation Neptune Spear on 1 May 2011. One such MH-60 helicopter crash-landed during the operation, and was destroyed by the team before it departed in the other MH-60 and a backup MH-47 Chinook with bin Laden's remains. Two MH-47s were used for the mission to refuel the two MH-60s and as backups. News media reported that the Pakistani government granted the Chinese military access to the wreckage of the crashed 'stealth' UH-60 variant in Abbotabad; Pakistan and China denied the reports, and the U.S. Government has not confirmed Chinese access.

Other and potential users
The United Arab Emirates requested 14 UH-60M helicopters and associated equipment in September 2008, through Foreign Military Sale. It had received 20 UH-60Ls by November 2010. Bahrain ordered nine UH-60Ms in 2007.

In December 2011, the Royal Brunei Air Force ordered twelve S-70i helicopters, which are similar to the UH-60M; four aircraft had been received by December 2013. On 12 June 2012, the U.S. Defense Security Cooperation Agency notified Congress that Qatar requested the purchase of twelve UH-60Ms, engines, and associated equipment.

On 25 February 2013, the Indonesian Army announced its interest in buying UH-60 Black Hawks as part of its effort to modernize its weaponry. The army wants them for combating terrorism, transnational crime, and insurgency to secure the archipelago.

On 27 May 2014, Croatian Defence Minister Ante Kotromanović announced the beginning of negotiations for the purchase of 15 used Black Hawks. On 12 October 2018, the US via Ambassador Robert Kohorst announced donation of two UH-60M helicopters with associated equipment and crew training to Croatia's Ministry of Defence, to be delivered in 2020. In 2019 October 30, the US State Dept approved the sale of two new UH-60M Blackhawks. On 3 February 2022, the first two helicopters were delivered to Croatia.

Tunisia requested 12 armed UH-60M helicopters in July 2014 through Foreign Military Sale. In August 2014, the U.S. ambassador stated that the U.S. "will soon make available" the UH-60Ms to Tunisia.

On 23 January 2015, the Malaysian Defence Minister Hishammuddin Hussein confirmed that Royal Malaysian Air Force (RMAF) is receiving S-70A Blackhawks from the Brunei government. These helicopters, believed to be four in total, were expected to be transferred to Malaysia by September with M134D miniguns added. The four Blackhawks were delivered to Royal Brunei Air Force (RBAF) in 1999.

In 2018, Latvia requested to buy four UH-60M Black Hawks with associated equipment for an estimated cost of $200 million. On 3 August 2018, the State Department approved the possible Foreign Military Sale. The Defense Security Cooperation Agency delivered the required certification notifying Congress of the possible sale. In November 2018, Latvia ordered four UH-60Ms, and received the first two in December 2022.

In 2019, Lithuania announced plans to buy six UH-60M helicopters before ordering four UH-60Ms in 2020. In 2019, Poland ordered four S-70i helicopters for its special forces.

In 2022, the Royal Air Force and British Army expects to select a helicopter for the New Medium Helicopter program to replace several existing helicopters. Sikorsky has indicated it expects its S-70M to meet the requirement.

Variants

The UH-60 comes in many variants, and many different modifications. The U.S. Army variants can be fitted with the stub wings to carry additional fuel tanks or weapons. Variants may have different capabilities and equipment to fulfill different roles.

Utility variants
YUH-60A: Initial test and evaluation version for U.S. Army. First flight on 17 October 1974; three built.
UH-60A Black Hawk: Original U.S. Army version, carrying a crew of four and up to 11 equipped troops. Equipped with T700-GE-700 engines. Produced 1977–1989. U.S. Army is equipping UH-60As with more powerful T700-GE-701D engines and also upgrading A-models to UH-60L standard.
UH-60C Black Hawk: Modified version for command and control (C2) missions.
CH-60E: Proposed troop transport variant for the U.S. Marine Corps.
UH-60L Black Hawk: UH-60A with upgraded T700-GE-701C engines, improved durability gearbox, and updated flight control system. Produced 1989–2007. UH-60Ls are also being equipped with the GE T700-GE-701D engine. The U.S. Army Corpus Christi Army Depot is upgrading UH-60A helicopters to the UH-60L configuration. In July 2018, Sierra Nevada Corporation proposed upgrading some converted UH-60L helicopters for the U.S. Air Force's UH-1N replacement program.
UH-60V Black Hawk: Upgraded version of the UH-60L with the electronic displays (glass cockpit) of the UH-60M. Upgrades performed by Northrop Grumman featuring a centralized processor with a partitioned, modular operational flight program enabling capabilities to be added as software-only modifications.
UH-60M Black Hawk: Improved design wide chord rotor blades, T700-GE-701D engines (max  each), improved durability gearbox, Integrated Vehicle Health Management System (IVHMS) computer, and new glass cockpit. Production began in 2006. Planned to replace older U.S. Army UH-60s.
UH-60M Upgrade Black Hawk: UH-60M with fly-by-wire system and Common Avionics Architecture System (CAAS) cockpit suite. Flight testing began in August 2008.

Special purpose
EH-60A Black Hawk: UH-60A with modified electrical system and stations for two electronic systems mission operators. All examples of type have been converted back to standard UH-60A configuration.
YEH-60B Black Hawk: UH-60A modified for special radar and avionics installations, prototype for stand-off target acquisition system.
EH-60C Black Hawk: UH-60A modified with special electronics equipment and external antenna. (All examples of type have been taken back to standard UH-60A configuration.)
EUH-60L (no official name assigned): UH-60L modified with additional mission electronic equipment for Army Airborne C2.
EH-60L Black Hawk: EH-60A with major mission equipment upgrade.
UH-60Q Black Hawk: UH-60A modified for medical evacuation. The UH-60Q is named DUSTOFF for "dedicated unhesitating service to our fighting forces".
HH-60L (no official name assigned): UH-60L extensively modified with medical mission equipment. Components include an external rescue hoist, integrated patient configuration system, environmental control system, on-board oxygen system (OBOGS), and crashworthy ambulatory seats.

HH-60M Black Hawk: UH-60M with medical mission equipment (medevac version) for U.S. Army.
HH-60U: USAF UH-60M version modified with an electro-optical sensor and rescue hoist. Three in use by Air Force pilots and special mission aviators since 2011. Has 85% commonality with the HH-60W.
HH-60W Jolly Green II: Modified version of the UH-60M for the U.S. Air Force as a Combat Rescue Helicopter to replace HH-60G Pave Hawks with greater fuel capacity and more internal cabin space, dubbed the "60-Whiskey". Deliveries to begin in 2019.
MH-60A Black Hawk: 30 UH-60As modified with additional avionics, night vision capable cockpit, FLIR, M134 door guns, internal auxiliary fuel tanks and other Special Operations mission equipment in early 1980s for U.S. Army. Equipped with T700-GE-701 engines. Variant was used by the 160th Special Operations Aviation Regiment. The MH-60As were replaced by MH-60Ls beginning in the early 1990s and passed to Army Aviation units in the Army National Guard.
MH-60K Black Hawk: Special operations modification first ordered in 1988 for use by the U.S. Army's 160th Special Operations Aviation Regiment ("Night Stalkers"). Equipped with the in-flight refueling probe, and T700-GE-701C engines. More advanced than the MH-60L, the K-model also includes an integrated avionics system (glass cockpit), AN/APQ-174B terrain-following radar, color weather map, improved weapons capability, and various defensive systems.
MH-60L Black Hawk: Special operations modification, used by the U.S. Army's 160th Special Operations Aviation Regiment ("Night Stalkers"), based on the UH-60L with T700-701C engines. It was developed as an interim version in the late 1980s pending fielding of the MH-60K. Equipped with many of the systems used on MH-60K, including FLIR, color weather map, auxiliary fuel system, and laser rangefinder/designator. A total of 37 MH-60Ls were built and some 10 had received an in-flight refueling probe by 2003.

MH-60L DAP: The Direct Action Penetrator (DAP) is a special operations modification of the baseline MH-60L, operated by the U.S. Army's 160th Special Operations Aviation Regiment. The DAP is configured as a gunship, with no troop-carrying capacity. The DAP is equipped with ESSS or ETS stub wings, each capable of carrying configurations of the M230 Chain Gun 30 mm automatic cannon, 19-shot Hydra 70 rocket pod, AGM-114 Hellfire missiles, AIM-92 Stinger air-to-air missiles, GAU-19 gun pods, and M134 minigun pods, M134D miniguns are used as door guns.

MH-60M Black Hawk: Special operations version of UH-60M for U.S. Army. Features the Rockwell Collins Common Avionics Architecture System (CAAS) glass cockpit and more powerful YT706-GE-700 engines. All special operations Black Hawks to be modernized to MH-60M standard by 2015.
MH-60 Black Hawk stealth helicopter: One of two (known) specially modified MH-60s used in the raid on Osama bin Laden's compound in Pakistan on 1 May 2011 was damaged in a hard landing, and was subsequently destroyed by U.S. forces. Subsequent reports state that the Black Hawk destroyed was a previously unconfirmed, but rumored, modification of the design with reduced noise signature and stealth technology. The modifications are said to add several hundred pounds to the base helicopter including edge alignment panels, special coatings and anti-radar treatments for the windshields.
UH-60A RASCAL: NASA-modified version for the Rotorcraft-Aircrew Systems Concepts Airborne Laboratory; a US$25M program for the study of helicopter maneuverability in three programs, Superaugmented Controls for Agile Maneuvering Performance (SCAMP), Automated Nap-of-the-Earth (ANOE) and Rotorcraft Agility and Pilotage Improvement Demonstration (RAPID). The UH-60A RASCAL performed a fully autonomous flight on 5 November 2012. U.S. Army personnel were on board, but the flying was done by the helicopter. During a two-hour flight, the Black Hawk featured terrain sensing, trajectory generation, threat avoidance, and autonomous flight control. It was fitted with a 3D-LZ laser detection and ranging (LADAR) system. The autonomous flight was performed between 200 and 400 feet. Upon landing, the onboard technology was able to pinpoint a safe landing zone, hover, and safely bring itself down.
OPBH: On 11 March 2014, Sikorsky successfully conducted the first flight demonstration of their Optionally Piloted Black Hawk (OPBH), a milestone part of the company's Manned/Unmanned Resupply Aerial Lifter (MURAL) program to provide autonomous cargo delivery for the U.S. Army. The helicopter used the company's Matrix technology (software to improve features of autonomous, optionally-piloted VTOL aircraft) to perform autonomous hover and flight operations under the control of an operator using a man-portable Ground Control Station (GCS). The MURAL program is a cooperative effort between Sikorsky, the US Army Aviation Development Directorate (ADD), and the US Army Utility Helicopters Project Office (UH PO). The purpose of creating an optionally-manned Black Hawk is to make the aircraft autonomously carry out resupply missions and expeditionary operations while increasing sorties and maintaining crew rest requirements and leaving pilots to focus more on sensitive operations.
VH-60D Night Hawk: VIP-configured HH-60D, used for presidential transport by USMC. T700-GE-401C engines. Variant was later redesignated VH-60N.

VH-60N White Hawk "White Top": Modified UH-60A with some features from the SH-60B/F Seahawks. Is one of the VIP-configured USMC helicopter models that perform Presidential and VIP transport as Marine One. The VH-60N entered service in 1988 and nine helicopters were delivered.
VH-60M Black Hawk "Gold Top": Heavily modified UH-60M used for executive transport. Members of the Joint Chiefs, Congressional leadership, and other DoD personnel are flown on these exclusively by the 12th Aviation Battalion at Fort Belvoir, Virginia.

Export versions
UH-60J Black Hawk: Variant for the Japanese Air Self Defense Force and Maritime Self Defense Force produced under license by Mitsubishi Heavy Industries. Also known as the S-70-12.
UH-60JA Black Hawk: Variant for the Japanese Ground Self Defense Force. It is license produced by Mitsubishi Heavy Industries.
AH-60L Arpía: Export version for Colombia developed by Elbit Systems, Sikorsky, and the Colombian Air Force. It is Counter-insurgency (COIN) attack version with improved electronics, firing system, FLIR, radar, light rockets and machine guns.
AH-60L Battle Hawk: Export armed version unsuccessfully tendered for Australian Army project AIR87, similar to AH-60L Arpía III. Sikorsky has also offered a Battlehawk armed version for export in the form of armament kits and upgrades. Sikorsky's Armed Black hawk demonstrator has tested a 20 mm turreted cannon, and different guided missiles. The United Arab Emirates ordered Battlehawk kits in 2011.
UH-60P Black Hawk: Version for South Korea Army, based on UH-60L with some improvements. Around 150 were produced under license by Korean Air.
S-70A Black Hawk: Sikorsky's designation for Black Hawk. Designation is often used for exports.
S-70A-1 Desert Hawk: Export version for the Royal Saudi Land Forces.
S-70A-L1 Desert Hawk: Aeromedical evacuation version for the Royal Saudi Land Forces.
S-70A-5 Black Hawk: Export version for the Philippine Air Force.
S-70A-6 Black Hawk: Export version for Thailand.
S-70A-9 Black Hawk: Export version for Australia, assembled under licence by Hawker de Havilland. First eight delivered to the Royal Australian Air Force, subsequently transferred to the Australian Army; remainder delivered straight to the Army after rotary-wing assets divested by the Air Force in 1989.
S-70A-11 Black Hawk: Export version for the Royal Jordanian Air Force.
S-70A-12 Black Hawk: Search and rescue model for the Japanese Air Self Defense Force and Maritime Self Defense Force. Also known as the UH-60J.
S-70A-14 Black Hawk: Export version for Brunei.
S-70A-16 Black Hawk: Engine test bed for the Rolls-Royce/Turbomeca RTM 332.
S-70A-17 Black Hawk: Export version for Turkey.
S-70A-18 Black Hawk: UH-60P and HH-60P for Republic of Korea Armed Forces built under license.
Sikorsky/Westland S-70-19 Black Hawk: This version is built under license in the United Kingdom by Westland. Also known as the WS-70.
S-70A-20 Black Hawk: VIP transport version for Thailand.
S-70A-21 Black Hawk: Export version for Egypt.
S-70A-22 Black Hawk: VH-60P for South Korea built under license. Used for VIP transport by the Republic of Korea Air Force. Its fuselage is tipped with white to distinguish from normal HH-60P.
S-70A-24 Black Hawk: Export version for Mexico.
S-70A-26 Black Hawk: Export version for Morocco.
S-70A-27 Black Hawk: Export version for Royal Hong Kong Auxiliary Air Force and Hong Kong Government Flying Service; three built.
S-70A-28D Black Hawk: Export version for Turkish Army.
S-70A-30 Black Hawk: Export version for Argentine Air Force, used as a VIP transport helicopter by the Presidential fleet; one built.
S-70A-33 Black Hawk: Export version for Royal Brunei Air Force.
S-70A-39 Black Hawk: VIP transport version for Chile; one built.
S-70A-42 Black Hawk: Export version for Austria.
S-70A-43 Black Hawk: Export version for Royal Thai Army.
S-70A-50 Black Hawk: Export version for Israel; 15 built.
S-70C-2 Black Hawk: Export version for People's Republic of China; 24 built.
S-70i Black Hawk: International military version assembled by Sikorsky's subsidiary, PZL Mielec in Poland.
S-70M Black Hawk: Modified military version assembled by Sikorsky's subsidiary, PZL Mielec in Poland from 2021.

 See: Sikorsky SH-60 Seahawk, Sikorsky HH-60 Pave Hawk, Piasecki X-49, and Sikorsky HH-60 Jayhawk for other Sikorsky S-70 variants.

Operators
See SH-60 Seahawk, HH-60 Pave Hawk, and HH-60 Jayhawk for operators of military H-60/S-70 variants; see Sikorsky S-70 for non-military operators of other H-60/S-70 family helicopters.

Afghan Air Force (commanded by the Taliban captured in Aug. 2021)
 
Albanian Air Force (3 on order)

 
Austrian Air Force
 
Royal Bahraini Air Force

 
Brazilian Air Force
Brazilian Army
Brazilian Navy (see SH-60)
 
Royal Brunei Air Force
 
Chilean Air Force
 
People's Liberation Army
 
Colombian Air Force AH-60L Arpía (24)
Colombian Army S-70i (7 as of 2013)

Croatian Air Force UH-60M (4)
 
Egyptian Air Force

 
Israeli Air Force

 
Japan Air Self-Defence Force UH-60J
Japan Ground Self-Defence Force UH-60JA
Japan Maritime Self-Defence Force UH-60J (see also SH-60J/K/L)
 
Royal Jordanian Air Force

 
 Latvian Air Force UH-60M (2; another 2 on order)
 
 Lithuanian Air Force UH-60M (4 on order; deliveries to begin in late 2024.)
 
Malaysian Army
Royal Malaysian Air Force
 
Mexican Air Force
Mexican Navy
 
Royal Moroccan Gendarmerie
 
Philippine Air Force S-70i (16) (32 on order)
 
Polish Special Forces S-70i (4) (4 on order) 

 Portuguese Air Force UH-60A (6 on order for aerial firefighting)
 
Royal Saudi Air Force
Royal Saudi Land Forces
Saudi Arabian National Guard
Royal Saudi Navy
 
Republic of Korea Army UH-60P
Republic of Korea Navy
 
Slovak Air Force
 
Swedish Air Force

 
Republic of China Air Force
Republic of China Army
Republic of China Navy
 
Royal Thai Army UH-60L; UH-60M
Royal Thai Air Force
 Royal Thai Navy (see SH-60)

Tunisian Air Force
 
Turkish Air Force (6 T-70s on order)
Turkish Army
 
United Arab Emirates Air Force
 
Main Directorate of Intelligence (Ukraine) - 1 UH-60A

 
United States Air Force (see HH-60)
United States Army
United States Navy (see SH-60)
United States Coast Guard (see MH-60)
United States Department of State
United States Department of Homeland Security

Former operators

 Royal Hong Kong Auxiliary Air Force
 Government Flying Service

 Afghan Air Force (until Aug. 2021)

Accidents

From 1981 to 1987, five Black Hawks crashed (killing or injuring all on board) while flying near radio broadcast towers because their electromagnetic emissions disrupted the helicopters' flight control systems. The Black Hawk helicopters were not hardened against high-intensity radiated fields, contrary to the SB-60 Seahawk Navy version. The pilots were instructed to fly away from emitters, and, in the long term, shielding was increased and backup systems were installed.
On 29 July 1992, one Australian Army Black Hawk collided into terrain near Oakey Army Aviation Centre. Killing two occupants.
 On 3 March 1994, a UH-60 helicopter of the 15th Fighter Wing, Republic of Korea Air Force (ROKAF) exploded above Yongin, Gyeonggi-do, killing all of the six personnel on board, including General Cho Kun-hae, then Chief of the Air Staff of South Korea.
 On 14 April 1994, two U.S. Army UH-60 Black Hawks in northern Iraq were shot down by mistake by U.S. Air Force F-15s patrolling the northern no-fly zone that had been imposed after the 1991 Gulf War. Twenty-six crew and passengers were killed.
 On 12 June 1996, two Australian Army Black Hawks collided during an Army night-time special forces counter-terrorism exercise resulting in the death of eighteen soldiers - fifteen members of the SASR and three from the 5th Aviation Regiment.
 On 12 February 2004, one Australian Army Black Hawk collided into terrain in vicinity of Mount Walker, Queensland following contact between the tail rotor and a tree. The air frame was written off however there were no deaths - six out of the eight occupants received injuries.
 On 29 November 2006, one Australian Army Black Hawk crashed into and subsequently slid off the deck of HMAS Kanimbla sinking into deep waters off the coast of Fiji whilst conducting a training flight. The sinking resulted in the deaths of two soldiers - one pilot from the 5th Aviation Regiment, and one trooper from the SASR.
 On 10 March 2015, a UH-60 from Eglin Air Force Base crashed off the coast of the Florida Panhandle near the base. All eleven on board were killed.
 On 16 February 2018, UH-60M helicopter deployed by the Mexican Air Force to Oaxaca after an earthquake, crashed into a group of people while attempting to land.
 On 2 January 2020, a UH-60M helicopter of the Republic of China Air Force (ROCAF) in Taiwan, crashed on a mountainside, killing eight people on board, including General Shen Yi-ming, chief of the general staff of Republic of China's armed forces.
On 23 June 2021, a Philippine Air Force S-70i crashed in Capaz town in Tarlac during a night flight training, killing all 6 crew members. The unit was newly delivered on November the previous year or only almost 8 months old.
On 22 February 2022, two Utah National Guard Black Hawk helicopters crashed at the Snowbird, Utah ski resort during a training exercise.  One Black Hawk was overcome by whiteout conditions caused by the downdraft in the snow, and crashed, causing parts of the rotor blades to strike the other helicopter, forcing a hard landing. There were no major injuries of crew or skiers.
On July 16, 2022, one Mexican Navy Black Hawk crashed at Sinaloa, killing 14 marines onboard.
On February 15, 2023, a Black Hawk crashed killing two members of Tennessee National Guard in Huntsville, Alabama.

Specifications (UH-60M)

See also

References

Notes

Citations

Bibliography

Bishop, Chris. Sikorsky UH-60 Black Hawk. Oxford, UK: Osprey, 2008. .
Leoni, Ray D. Black Hawk, The Story of a World Class Helicopter. Reston, Virginia: American Institute of Aeronautics and Astronautics, 2007. .
Tomajczyk, Stephen F. Black Hawk. St. Paul, Minnesota: MBI, 2003. .

External links

UH/HH-60 Black Hawk U.S. Army page
Lockheed Martin's BLACK HAWK page
YUH-60A cutaway image on flightglobal.com
UTTAS program, origin of the Black Hawk on helis.com
UH-60 Blackhawk medium size utility helicopter(Air recognition)
S-70A-42 Black Hawk of the Austrian Army
Military.com with data on range extending devices
UH-60 Black Hawk on kamov.net

Twin-turbine helicopters
United States military helicopters
H-060, U
1970s United States helicopters
Sikoysky H-60 Black Hawk
H-060 Black Hawk
Search and rescue helicopters
Aircraft first flown in 1974